Central Baptist Church is a historic Southern Baptist church at 26 Radcliffe Street in Charleston, South Carolina.
The Central Baptist Church was completed in
1893 and is considered the first church in Charleston founded and
constructed entirely by African-Americans. The structure reflects
Carpenter Gothic and Italianate influences and remains in excellent
condition. Perhaps the most significant features of the structure are
the large folk-art murals portraying biblical scenes including the
Crucifixion, the Ascension, and the Resurrection of Christ which
date back to 1915. Architect, John Pearson Hutchinson Sr., was hired as a negro carpenter, building
contractor, and non-licensed architect. He was also a Deacon of the church.
It was built in 1891 and added to the National Register in 1977.

References

Baptist churches in South Carolina
Churches on the National Register of Historic Places in South Carolina
Carpenter Gothic church buildings in South Carolina
Churches completed in 1891
19th-century Baptist churches in the United States
Churches in Charleston, South Carolina
National Register of Historic Places in Charleston, South Carolina
Southern Baptist Convention churches